Bhupen Hazarika BR (8 September 1926 – 5 November 2011) was an Indian playback singer, lyricist, musician, poet, actor, filmmaker and politician from Assam, widely known as Sudha Kontho (meaning cuckoo, literally "nectar-throated"). His songs were written and sung mainly in the Assamese language by himself, are marked by humanity and universal brotherhood and have been translated and sung in many languages, most notably in Bengali and Hindi.

His songs, based on the themes of communal amity, universal justice and empathy, are especially popular among the people of Assam, West Bengal and Bangladesh. He is also acknowledged to have introduced the culture and folk music of Assam and Northeast India to Hindi cinema at the national level. He received the National Film Award for Best Music Direction in 1975, the Sangeet Natak Akademi Award (1987), Padma Shri (1977), and Padma Bhushan (2001), Dada Saheb Phalke Award (1992), the highest award for cinema in India and Sangeet Natak Akademi Fellowship (2008), the highest award of the Sangeet Natak Akademi. He was posthumously awarded both the Padma Vibhushan, India's second-highest civilian award, in 2012, and the Bharat Ratna, India's highest civilian award, in 2019. Hazarika also held the position of the Chairman of the Sangeet Natak Akademi from December 1998 to December 2003.

== Biography ==

Early life
Hazarika was born on 8 September 1926 to Nilakanta and Shantipriya Hazarika in Sadiya, an interior town of Assam on the bank of river Brahmaputra. His father was originally from Nazira, a town located in Sivasagar district. The eldest of ten children, Bhupen Hazarika (as well as his siblings) was exposed to the musical influence of his mother, who exposed him to lullabies and traditional Music of Assam. His father moved to the Bharalumukh region of Guwahati in 1929, in search of better prospects, where Bhupen Hazarika spent his early childhood. In 1932, his father further moved to Dhubri, and in 1935 to Tezpur. It was in Tezpur that Bhupen Hazarika, then 10-years-of-age, was discovered by Jyotiprasad Agarwala, the noted Assamese lyricist, playwright and the first Assamese filmmaker, and Bishnu Prasad Rabha, renowned Assamese artist and revolutionary poet, where he sang a Borgeet (the traditional classical Assamese devotional songs written by Srimanta Sankardeva and Sri Sri Madhabdeva), taught by his mother at a public function. In 1936, Bhupen Hazarika accompanied them to Kolkata where he recorded his first song at the Aurora Studio for the Selona Company. His association with the icons of Assamese culture at Tezpur was the beginning of his artistic growth and credentials. Subsequently, Hazarika sang two songs in Agarwala's film Indramalati (1939): Kaxote Kolosi Loi and Biswo Bijoyi Naujawan at the age of 12. A revolutionary zeal was rooted during his childhood. Its expression was, no doubt, “Agnijugar firingathi mai” (I am the spark of the age of fire) which was written at 14 years of his age and he was well on his way to becoming a lyricist, composer and singer.

Education and career
Hazarika studied at Sonaram High School at Guwahati, Dhubri Government High School and matriculated from Tezpur High School in 1940. He completed his Intermediate Arts from Cotton College in 1942, and his BA (1944) and MA (1946) in Political Science from Banaras Hindu University. For a brief period, he worked at All India Radio, Guwahati when he won a scholarship from Columbia University and set sail for New York in 1949. There he earned a PhD (1952) on his thesis "Proposals for Preparing India's Basic Education to use Audio-Visual Techniques in Adult Education". In New York, Bhupen Hazarika befriended Paul Robeson, a prominent civil rights activist, who influenced him. He used music as the “instrument of social change” following the path of Paul Robeson who once told him about his 
guitar - “Guitar is not a musical instrument, it is a social instrument.” His song Bistirno Parore which is based on the tune, imagery and theme of Robeson's Ol' Man River. This song is translated in various Indian languages, including Bengali and Hindi and sung by the artist himself, and is still popular. Being inspired from some other foreign ones, he also composed several other songs in Indian languages. He was exposed to the Spiritual, and the multi-lingual version of We are in the Same Boat Brother became a regular feature in his stage performance. At Columbia University, he met Priyamvada Patel, whom he married in 1950. Tez Hazarika, their only child, was born in 1952, and he returned to India in 1953.

His famous songs include (in Assamese):

 Bistirno Parore (বিস্তীৰ্ণ পাৰৰে) 
 Moi Eti Jajabor (মই এটি যাযাবৰ) 
 Ganga Mor Maa (গংগা মোৰ মা) 
 Bimurto Mur Nixati Jen (বিমূৰ্ত মোৰ নিশাটি যেন) 
 Manuhe Manuhor Babey (মানুহে মানুহৰ বাবে) 
 Snehe Aamar Xoto Shrabonor (স্নেহে আমাৰ শত শ্ৰাৱণৰ) 
 Gupute Gupute Kimaan Khelim (গুপুতে গুপুতে কিমান খেলিম) 
 Buku Hom Hom Kore (বুকু হম্‌ হম্‌ কৰে) 
 Sagar sangamat (সাগৰ সংগমত) 
 Shillongore Godhuli (শ্বিলঙৰে গধূলি)

IPTA years
Hazarika began close association with the leftist Indian People's Theatre Association soon after returning from the US in 1953 and became the Secretary of the Reception Committee of the Third All Assam Conference of IPTA, held in Guwahati in 1955.

Professional life
After completing his MA, he briefly worked at the All India Radio station at Guwahati before embarking for his doctoral studies at Columbia University. Soon after completing his education, he became a teacher at the Guwahati University. But after a few years, he left the job and went to Kolkata where he established himself as a successful music director and singer. During that period, Hazarika made several award-winning Assamese films such as Shakuntala, Pratidhwani etc. and composed evergreen music for many Assamese films. He was also considered as a new trend setter in Bengali music. Bhupen Hazarika composed music for films from Bangladesh to which got international acclaim. He was elected the President of the Asam Sahitya Sabha in 1993. In 1967, Hazarika got elected as a member of Assam Assembly from Naoboicha constituency.

Social Struggle

From early in his life, he was at the forefront of a social battle against the entrenched forces of casteism that sneered at a member of the Koibarta community making it as a musician of note and kept him away from the upper-caste Brahmin woman he had loved. Eventually, when the spirited Hazarika did marry, it was to a Brahmin woman, his revenge of sorts against a caste-ridden society.

Later life
He was introduced to Kalpana Lajmi in the early 1970s by his childhood friend and India's top tea planter Hemendra Prasad Barooah in Kolkata. Her first feature film Ek Pal with music score by Hazarika was produced by Barooah. Subsequently, Lajmi began assisting him professionally and personally till the end of his life.
In the period after the release of Ek Pal (1986) until his death, Bhupen Hazarika mainly concentrated on Hindi films, most of which were directed by Kalpana Lajmi. Ek Pal (1986), Rudaali (1993) and Daman: A Victim of Marital Violence (2001) are major films of this period. Many of his earlier songs were re-written in Hindi and used as played-back songs in these films. These songs tried to cater to the Hindi film milieu and their social activist lyrics were browbeaten into the lowest common denominator.
He served as an MLA (Independent) during 1967–72 in the Assam Legislative Assembly from Naoboicha Constituency.
He contested as a Bharatiya Janata Party candidate in the 2004 Lok Sabha elections from the Guwahati constituency, persuaded by Chandan Mitra via Kalpana Lajmi which he lost to the Indian National Congress candidate Kirip Chaliha.

Death
Hazarika was hospitalized in the Kokilaben Dhirubhai Ambani Hospital and Medical Research Institute in Mumbai in 2011. He was admitted to the intensive care unit on 30 June 2011. He died of multi-organ failure on 5 November 2011. His body lay in state at Judges Field in Guwahati and cremated on 9 November 2011 near the Brahmaputra River in a plot of land donated by Gauhati University. His funeral was attended by an estimated half a million people.

Legacy and influences

As a singer, Hazarika was known for his baritone voice; as a lyricist, he was known for poetic compositions and parables which touched on themes ranging from romance to social and political commentary; and as a composer, for his use of folk music. In a poll conducted in Bangladesh, his song, Manush Manusher Jonno (Humans are for humanity)' was chosen to be the second most favorite number after the National anthem of Bangladesh. Some of his most famous compositions were adaptations of American Black Spiritual that he had learned from Paul Robeson, whom he had befriended during his years in New York City in the early 1950s. His famous song "Bistirno Parore" is heavily influenced by Ol' Man River sung by Paul Robeson.

During his lifetime, a full-length documentary feature biopic film on his life titled Moi Eti Zazabor('I am a Wanderer') jointly directed by Late Waesqurni Bora and Arnab Jan Deka was launched in 1986 at his Nizarapar residence in Guwahati city. Music for this biopic film has been scored by 5-time International Best Music Awards winner only Assamese musician, songwriter, composer and singer Jim Ankan Deka, who also worked as Chief Assistant Director of this film. During the next two decades, the joint directors Late Bora and Deka shot him live for the film during his various public performances all over India, as well as many private moments in his domestic and social life. Arnab Jan Deka also extensively interviewed him regarding his life and its creative aspects for the film, which had been recorded during their joint travel to different metropolises and remote corners of Assam and rest of India. The film has been under production since 1986 with film negative footage of more than 16 hours currently preserved in different film laboratories in Bombay (Mumbai), Calcutta (Kolkata) and Madras (Chennai). The film was targeted for public release during the lifetime of Dr Bhupen Hazarika in 2008. But the production was halted after sudden demise of one of the co-directors Waesqurni Bora in November 2008. Eventually, after the death of Dr Hazarika, the film's subject, the surviving co-director Arnab Jan Deka is currently carrying out necessary works to finish the film at the earliest and release for public consumption in several language versions including English, Assamese, Bengali and Hindi, with support from Late Waesqurni Bora's widowed wife Nazma Begum and Dr Hazarika's bereaved family members including his wife Priyam Hazarika and Tej Hazarika. Meanwhile, two books describing the unforgettable experiences of the making of this milestone biopic film had been authored by its co-director Arnab Jan Deka titled Anya Ek Zazabor and Mor Sinaki Bhupenda, first of which had been officially released in February 1993 by Late G P Sippy, then President of Film Federation of India and producer of world-record holder Hindi film Sholay at a public function organised by Dr Bhupen Hazarika himself.

Awards and honors

National and state honors
 Award for the Best Feature Film in Assamese (Shakuntala; Directed by Bhupen Hazarika) in the 9th National Film Awards (1961)
 The Best Music Director National Award for "Chameli Memsaab" (Chameli Memsaab; music by Bhupen Hazarika) in the 23rd National Film Awards (1975)
 Padma Shri – the fourth highest civilian award in the Republic of India (1977)
 Gold medal from the State Government of Arunachal Pradesh for "outstanding contribution towards tribal welfare, and uplift of tribal culture through cinema and music." (1979)
 Sangeet Natak Akademi Award (1987)
 Dadasaheb Phalke Award (1992)
 Padma Bhushan – the third highest civilian award in the Republic of India (2001)
 Sangeet Natak Akademi Fellowship (2008)
 Asom Ratna — the highest civilian award in the State of Assam, India (2009)
 Friends of Liberation War Honour, Government of Bangladesh (2011)
 Padma Vibhushan – the second highest civilian award in the Republic of India (2012, posthumous)
 Bharat Ratna, the highest civilian award in the Republic of India (2019, posthumous)

Other awards and recognition

 All India Critic Association Award for best performing folk artist (1979)
 In 1979 and 1980 he won the Ritwik Ghatak Award as best music director for two theatre plays, Mohua Sundari, and Nagini Kanyar Kahini
 Bengal Journalist's Association Indira Gandhi Smriti Puraskar in (1987)
 First Indian to win Best Music for the film Rudaali at the Asia Pacific International Film Festival in Japan (1993)
 Honorary Degree from Tezpur University (2001)
 10th Kalakar Award for Lifetime Achievement in the year 2002, Kolkata.
 In February 2009, the All Assam Students Union erected a life size statue of Hazarika on the banks of Digholi Pukhuri in Guwahati.
 A full-length docu-feature biopic film on his life titled Moi Eti Zazabor('I am a Wanderer') jointly directed by Late Waesqurni Bora and Arnab Jan Deka has been under production since 1986
In 2010, Assam Cricket Association renamed the Barshapara Cricket Stadium as Dr. Bhupen Hazarika Cricket Stadium.
 Muktijoddha Padak— Awarded as a "Friend of the Freedom Struggle" award by Bangladesh Government (posthumously, 2011)
 Asom Sahitya Sabha has honored him with the title "Biswa Ratna".
 Hazarika was honored with commemorative postage stamps by India Post in 2013 and 2016.
 The longest road bridge of India, Dhola-Sadiya bridge is built over the river Lohit, which is a tributary of the Brahmaputra. It links Dhola and Sadiya both are in Tinsukia district of Assam is named after him.
 On 8 September 2022, Google honored Hazarika with a Google Doodle to mark his 96th birth anniversary. The doodle, featuring Hazarika playing the harmonium, was created by Mumbai-based guest artist Rutuja Mali.

Filmography

Notes

External links

 Lyrics of 700+ Bhupendra Sangeets
 Official website
 
 Digital Archive of Bhupen Hazarika

Gallery

1926 births
2011 deaths
Assamese singers
Assamese playback singers
Assamese-language singers
Assamese-language film directors
Asom Sahitya Sabha Presidents
Columbia University alumni
Banaras Hindu University alumni
Bollywood playback singers
Dadasaheb Phalke Award recipients
Deaths from multiple organ failure
Film directors from Assam
Singers from Assam
Musicians from Assam
Recipients of the Padma Bhushan in arts
Recipients of the Sangeet Natak Akademi Award
Recipients of the Sangeet Natak Akademi Fellowship
People from Tinsukia district
Indian film score composers
Recipients of the Padma Vibhushan in arts
Best Music Direction National Film Award winners
Cotton College, Guwahati alumni
20th-century Indian musicians
Members of the Assam Legislative Assembly
Bharatiya Janata Party politicians from Assam
Recipients of the Padma Shri in arts
Indian male film score composers
Recipients of the Bharat Ratna
20th-century Indian male singers
20th-century Indian singers
Assamese film score composers
Bengali film score composers
Hindi film score composers
Assamese-language lyricists